Eupterocerina is a genus of picture-winged flies in the family Ulidiidae.

Species
 E. conjuncta

References

Ulidiidae